Inner membrane may refer to:
Inner nuclear membrane
Chloroplast inner membrane
Inner mitochondrial membrane
Plastid inner membrane